Trochoideus desjardinsi is a species of handsome fungus beetle in the family Endomychidae. It is found in Africa, North America, and Southern Asia.

Distribution
The species is widely distributed in many Pacific and Indian islands and mainlands such as Andaman Islands, Borneo, Fiji, India, Java, Madagascar, Malay Peninsula, the Mascarene Islands, Myanmar, New Guinea, the Philippines, Samoa, Seychelles, Sri Lanka, Thailand. It is also introduced to Florida in the United States.

Description
Typical length is about 3.0 to 4.0mm. Body elongate and parallel-sided. Dorsum consists with short dense setae. Antennae with five segments, short, and swollen as an adaptation to life with ants and termites. The last antennal segment is greatly swollen in males whereas female has a sausage-shaped last antennal segment. Pronotum with lateral sulci by very shallow depressions on the basal margin. Prosternum very narrow. Tarsi are 4 segmented.

Biology
Adults are considered as a minor pest of stored grain products where it feeds on the hyphae and spores of a variety of molds. They commonly inhabited in the dead leaves, in dead wood, and under bark. They are known to live in the nests of the ants Paratrechina longicornis and Anoplolepis longipes and termite species such as Macrotermes gilvus and Eurytermes ceylonicus. Adults are often collected from many economically important plants such as banana, in rotten papaya, in dead rachis of Angiopteris and rotting coconut husks. Adults are easily attracted to many light traps such as ethanol/turpentine traps, mercury vapor lights, black lights, and fluorescent light traps.

References

Further reading

External links

 

Endomychidae
Beetles described in 1857